Xestia wockei is a moth of the family Noctuidae. It is known from Siberia and northern North America, including Quebec, Newfoundland and Labrador, the Northwest Territories and Yukon.

Subspecies
Xestia wockei wockei
Xestia wockei troubridgei Lafontaine, 1998
Xestia wockei aldani (Herz, 1903)
Xestia wockei tundrana (A.Bang-Haas, 1912) (South Siberian Mountains, Central Yakutian Lowland and the mountains of north-eastern Siberia)

Xestia scropulana was generally included in X. wockei, but more recent authors usually treat it as distinct species.

References

Xestia
Moths of Asia
Moths of North America